Thomas Charles Beirne KSG (1860–1949) was an early businessman, politician and philanthropist in colonial and federation era Queensland, Australia.

Early life

Thomas Beirne was born on 9 July 1860 in County Roscommon at Ballymacurly, near Ballymoe, the third child of eight to parents considered to be 'the small farmer class'.

The young Beirne migrated to Melbourne on the Orient steamer SS Lusitania (1871) boarding in December 1883 and arriving in February 1884. From Williamstown, seeking out work, he settled with Eyre and Shepherd as a junior salesman in the manchester department at 30 shillings a week.  After being a joint manager of the Richmond branch, but not being accepted for a wage rise to 45 shillings, Beirne left Eyre and Shepherd, and started to work with Foy and Gibson until mid-1885.

Business life

After a letter from Mr. M . D. Pigott, an old employer from Tuam, Ireland, and now in Brisbane, Queensland, Beirne left for Brisbane to be an equal partner in a business. He found the shop in Stanley Street disappointing, left, and found a job with Allan and Stark also on Stanley Street. With some opportunity and planning, in 1886, the firm of Pigott and Beirne was opening at Stanley Street opposite Annerley Road.

These series of business ventures saw him establish a successful drapery business in Brisbane.  A number of years later, T. C. Beirne and Company Proprietary Limited was registered with a nominal capital of £1000000.  The TC Beirne Department Store building is now heritage-listed.

In Brisbane Beirne became an active member of the Brisbane Traders' Association, including its president in 1901. He was also a board member of Brisbane Tramway Co, Australian Mutual Provident Society, the Atlas Assurance Co and the British Australian Cotton Association.

In 2021Thomas Charles Beirne was inducted into the Queensland Business Leaders Hall of Fame.

Politics

He was also involved in the early stages of the Australian Labour Party and from 1905 till 1922 he was a member of the Queensland Legislative Council.

Benefactor

As one of Australia’s first millionaires, T. C. Beirne’s generous philanthropy created lasting community legacies. Beirne was Warden of the University of Queensland and in 1935 donated £20,000 to establish the TC Beirne School of Law.

He was also a benefactor of Holy Name Cathedral, Brisbane, the Pius XII Regional Seminary at Banyo, Mater Misericordiae Hospital and Duchesne College in the University of Queensland.

He was awarded a papal knighthood of the Order of St Gregory by pope Pius XI and was a close associate with politicians William Higgs and Frank McDonnell and was friends with Archbishop James Duhig.

Later life

Beirne died in 1949. His funeral, which was presided over by Archbishop James Duhig, was held at St Stephen's Cathedral and proceeded to the Nudgee Cemetery. Despite his generosity during his lifetime, he left an estate of over £1.24 million which was mainly bequeathed to his five daughters and numerous grandchildren.

The State Library of Queensland holds the T.C. Beirne company Records as well as examples of his catalogues.

Legacy

Thomas Beirne is remembered today by:
 T C Beirne Park, a park that once formed part of the grounds of his Hendra home, Glengariff
 TC Beirne Department Store, now the T C Beirne Centre, a shopping center in Fortitude Valley
 TC Beirne School of Law at the University of Queensland

A number of buildings associated with Thomas Beirne are listed on the Queensland Heritage Register, including:
 his home Glengariff in Hendra
 his retail premises TC Beirne Department Store
 accommodation built for his staff Bulolo Flats
In 2021, Beirne was inducted into the Queensland Business Leaders Hall of Fame.

References

External links 

 Queensland Business Leaders Hall of Fame
 T. C Beirne digital story and oral history: Queensland Business Leaders Hall of Fame 2021, State Library of Queensland

1860 births
1949 deaths
Members of the Queensland Legislative Council
Burials at Nudgee Cemetery
19th-century Australian businesspeople
20th-century Australian businesspeople
People from County Roscommon
Irish emigrants to colonial Australia